Mravec (feminine: Mravcová) is a Slovak surname. Notable people with this surname include:

 Dušan Mravec (born 1980), Slovak painter
 Katrin Lengyelová née Mravcová (born 1972), Slovak journalist
 Michal Mravec (born 1987), Slovak footballer

See also
 

Slovak-language surnames